Mellitic anhydride, the anhydride of mellitic acid, is an organic compound with the formula C12O9.

Containing no other elements (e.g., hydrogen) besides carbon and oxygen, mellitic anhydride is an oxide of carbon  (oxocarbon), and, along with CO2, CO, and C3O2, is one of the only four that are reasonably stable under standard conditions.  It is a white sublimable solid, apparently obtained by Justus Liebig and Friedrich Wöhler in 1830 in their study of mellite ("honey stone") and has the empirical formula C4O3. The substance was properly characterized in 1913 by H. Meyer and K. Steiner. It retains the aromatic character of the benzene ring.

References 

Phthalic anhydrides
Oxocarbons